The Hamburg Area School District is a small, rural/suburban public school district serving parts of Berks County, Pennsylvania. It encompasses the communities of Shoemakersville, Perry Twp, Windsor Twp, Hamburg, Tilden Twp, Upper Bern Twp, Strausstown, and Upper Tulpehocken Township. The District is one of the 500 public school districts of Pennsylvania. It is the largest, geographically, of Berks County's 18 public school districts. According to 2000 federal census data, Hamburg Area School District served a resident population of 18,103. By 2010, the District's population increased to 21,088 people. In 2009, Hamburg Area School District residents’ per capita income was $20,105, while the median family income was $53,440. In the Commonwealth, the median family income was $49,501 and the United States median family income was $49,445, in 2010. By 2013, the median household income in the United States rose to $52,100.

Hamburg Area School District operates: Perry Elementary Center (K-5), Tilden Elementary Center (K-5), Hamburg Area Middle School (6-8) and Hamburg Area High School (9-12).

Extracurriculars
The Hamburg Area School District offers a wide variety of clubs, activities and an extensive sports program.

Sports
The District funds:

Boys
Baseball - AAA
Basketball- AAA
Bowling - AAAA
Cross Country - AA
Football - AA
Golf - AA
Indoor Track and Field - AAAA
Soccer - AA
Swimming and Diving - AA
Tennis - AA
Track and Field - AAA
Wrestling - AA

Girls
Basketball - AAA
Bowling - AAAA
Cross Country - AA
Indoor Track and Field - AAAA
Field Hockey - AA
Golf - AA
Soccer (Fall) - AA
Softball - AAA
Swimming and Diving - AA
Girls' Tennis - AA
Track and Field - AA

Middle School Sports

Boys
Baseball
Basketball
Cross Country
Football
Soccer
Track and Field
Wrestling	

Girls
Basketball
Cross Country
Field Hockey
Softball 
Soccer (fall)
Track and Field

According to PIAA directory July 2013

References

School districts in Berks County, Pennsylvania